Brian Copeland (born 1964) is an American actor, comedian, radio talk show host, playwright and author based in the San Francisco Bay Area.

Copeland has been the opening act for artists such as Ray Charles, Natalie Cole, Aretha Franklin and Ringo Starr.  For the past 18 years he has hosted a radio program for San Francisco radio station KGO. His program formerly aired weekdays from 2-4p. On September 13, 2010, he began serving as host of "7 Live," a new hour-long, weekday program on KGO-TV in San Francisco. He is the father of three children, all of whom have followed him into show business.

Early life
Copeland was born in Akron, Ohio and grew up in Hayward, California and San Leandro, California.

He attended Moreau Catholic High School, located in Hayward, California.
He studied Political Science at Holy Names University.

Not a Genuine Black Man

Play 
In 2004, Copeland premiered his first one-man show, Not a Genuine Black Man, at The Marsh. The show is an account of his experiences growing up in the East Bay suburb of San Leandro, California in the 1970s, when it was considered a racist enclave due to its 86.4% white population and the coordinated policies of housing discrimination and segregation which were in place until the 1960s.  The play, originally scheduled for a six-week run, went on to run 25 months, becoming the longest-running one-man show in San Francisco history.

GENUINE ran Off Broadway and in over 30 U.S. cities logging over 700 performances during its initial 7-year run.

"The Waiting Period"
In February 2012, Copeland premiered his second solo show entitled "The Waiting Period" at the Marsh in San Francisco. The play is a memoir of Copeland's battle with suicidal depression. The 'waiting period' in the title, refers to California's mandatory ten-day waiting period before Copeland could bring home the gun he had purchased for the purpose of ending his life.

The play received rave reviews from critics (as well as depression and suicide support groups and the mental health community) and currently plays to sold out crowds. The message of the comedy/drama is for those suffering from debilitating depression and suicidal thoughts to "Tell Somebody" and ask for help before it's too late.

The play has been extended five times as of this writing. A book is forthcoming and talks are currently under way for a major motion picture based upon the work.

THE JEWELRY BOX

Copeland's third solo play, THE JEWELRY BOX, opened in November 2013. The holiday play about his quest to earn the $11.97 to buy his mother a jewelry box from the White Front discount store in 1970 East Oakland was hailed by critics as, "an instant holiday classic" and "the Bay Area's Christmas story."

A novella based on the play was published in 2015.

THE SCION

In 2014, Copeland opened his critically acclaimed THE SCION, an investigation into the circumstances that led to fellow San Leandro resident Stuart Alexander murdering 3 government meat inspectors who tried to inspect his Santos Liguisa Factory in June 2000.

Book 
In 2006, the publishing house Hyperion released a memoir by Copeland based upon his play.

In 2009, the book was selected by "Silicon Valley Reads" as the one to read and discuss as a community. This organization represents this Northern Californian region's libraries, bookstores, and schools, along with some civic leaders.

Film career
In 2006, Copeland was cast as the son of Morgan Freeman's character in the Rob Reiner film The Bucket List, also starring Jack Nicholson.
In 2021, Copeland appeared in the sequel to the hit film VENOM entitled VENOM: LET THERE BE CARNAGE.

References

External links
Brian Copeland's biography at KGO Radio
Brian Copeland official website

 San Francisco Chronicle review The Waiting Period

1964 births
Living people
American male film actors
American talk radio hosts
People from Hayward, California
People from San Leandro, California
Radio personalities from San Francisco
Male actors from the San Francisco Bay Area
Writers from the San Francisco Bay Area
African-American male actors
21st-century American comedians
Comedians from California
21st-century African-American people
20th-century African-American people